Yeh Woh Manzil To Nahin (English:  This Is Not Our Destination) is a 1987 Hindi drama film written and directed by Sudhir Mishra, in a directorial debut. It starred Manohar Singh, Habib Tanvir, B. M. Shah, Pankaj Kapur, Sushmita Mukherjee and Naseeruddin Shah in lead roles.

At the  34th National Film Awards, it won the award for Best Debut Film of a Director.

Plot
Three schooling friends now old men, are travelling by train from Bombay to Rajpur for the centenary celebration at their boarding school. On their journey, they recall their days of student activism, and failures. Upon reaching they find once again confronted by political skirmishes, which reminds them of events wherein they failed to uphold their conscience.

Cast
 Manohar Singh as  Shamsher Singh
 Habib Tanvir as Akhtar Baig
 B. M. Shah as Murlimanohar Joshi
 Pankaj Kapur as Rohit, student leader
 Sushmita Mukherjee as Savita, journalist
 Naseeruddin Shah as Trivedi, Industrialist
 Ajit Vachani as Police Superintendent
 Lalit Tiwari as Srikant
 Rajendra Gupta as Vice-Chancellor Asthana
 Kusum Haider as Ismat
 Alok Nath
 Raja Bundela as Uttam Trivedi, the Industrialist's Son
 Rajendranath Zutshi
 Vimal Banerjee as DIG Mishra
 Swadesh Bandhu as City Magistrate

References

External links
 
 

1987 films
Indian drama films
1987 drama films
Films set in schools
Films about the education system in India
1980s Hindi-language films
Best Debut Feature Film of a Director National Film Award winners
Films directed by Sudhir Mishra
Hindi-language drama films